Liu Shan Bang (1800 – 1857) was a Chinese gold miner in Bau, Sarawak. He was best known as the leader of the 1857 Chinese Uprising against the White Rajah James Brooke.

History
A Hakka born in Lufeng, Guangdong of the Qing dynasty, around 1800, Liu left for Sambas, Borneo, at the age of 20. He is said to have worked at the Sam Tiau Kow (Santiaogou) gold mine there until mistreatment by the Dutch caused him to lead a group of miners to the Bau area of Sarawak (perhaps Pangkalan Tebang). He organised the 'Twelve Kongsi' company which operated the Mau San gold mine and made the mining town of Mau San (or Bau Lama) effectively self-governing.

They unearthed gold deposits and turned Mau San into a prosperous and thriving gold town. Events allegedly took a wrong turn when The White Rajah, James Brooke, imposed high taxes on the gold mine business.

Revolt and massacre
On 18 February 1857, Liu Shan Bang led 600 Chinese rebels by the Sarawak River to attack the White Rajah in Kuching. Unknown to the rebels, Brooke fled from his home and dived into the Kuching River to emerge to the other side. Five Europeans were killed, properties including Brooke's house were burnt, and the town in disarray, with most Europeans sheltering in the grounds of the Anglican Church. The rebels mistook a 17 year-old boy as the White Rajah, beheaded him and paraded his head on a pole around the town.

However, the insurgents did not want to assume the government; they offered it to Helms the manager of the Borneo Company and another trader called Ruppell, with the Datu Bandar administering the Malays, and withdrew upriver. Liu also sat on the White Rajah's seat.

Death
However, only a day later, Liu had discovered that the White Rajah was still alive. In retaliation, Brooke enlisted the help of his Malay supporters, while his nephew Charles Brooke sailed from Lingga with a force of Iban soldiers. On 23 February Charles led a force of Ibans to join up with the local Bidayuh tribes in pursuit of Liu and his rebels.

The following day, while on the way back to Bau, Liu and his rebels were under attack by the Rajah's Iban forces. Liu managed to regroup at Jugan in Siniawan, but was heavily outnumbered. There Liu was shot dead and his rebels were killed.

Charles' Iban forces pursued the remaining rebels to Bau, where they slaughtered the 3,000 villagers including women, children and old folks in a massacre and left their bodies to rot.

Legacy
A stone was placed to mark his grave, and a small temple erected by it, although the reason was kept secret for over a century. Liu was elevated by the community to a deity named “Shin”.

On 27 July 1993, Liu Shanbang was included in the 'freedom fighters, liberators, and martyrs' unveiled on the new Heroes' Monument in the Sarawak Museum Garden.

References

Malaysian rebels
Malaysian warriors
People from Sarawak
Year of birth unknown
1857 deaths
Raj of Sarawak
Malaysian people of Hakka descent
1850s in British Malaya
People from British Borneo
1800 births